The 1999 Canadian Open was a WTA tennis tournament, played on outdoor hard courts.

Players

Seeds

Qualifiers

Lucky losers

Qualifying draw

First qualifier

Second qualifier

Third qualifier

Fourth qualifier

Fifth qualifier

Sixth qualifier

Seventh qualifier

Eighth qualifier

References
 1999 du Maurier Open Women's Singles Qualifying Draw

Singles Qualifying
Qualification for tennis tournaments